The 1983 UNLV Rebels football team was an American football team that represented the University of Nevada, Las Vegas in the Pacific Coast Athletic Association during the 1983 NCAA Division I-A football season. In their second year under head coach Harvey Hyde, the team compiled a 7–4 record. In March 1985, the NCAA ruled UNLV to forfeit all of its victories from their 1983 and 1984 seasons due to playing with ineligible players.

Schedule

References

UNLV
UNLV Rebels football seasons
UNLV Rebels football
College football winless seasons